The Gateway Eastern Railway  is a railroad subsidiary of the Kansas City Southern Railway (KCS), owning a  main line between East Alton and East St. Louis, Illinois, United States. Originally created in 1994 as a subsidiary of the Gateway Western Railway, which acquired the East St. Louis-Kansas City line of the Chicago, Missouri and Western Railway in 1990, it was acquired by KCS along with its parent in 1997.

History
The line between East St. Louis and East Alton was completed by the Belleville and Illinoistown Railroad in 1856, as an extension of its Belleville-East St. Louis (Illinoistown) line. Ownership passed to the St. Louis, Alton and Terre Haute Railroad, a predecessor of the Illinois Central Railroad, but in 1890 that company sold that segment to the Cairo, Vincennes and Chicago Railway, which became part of the Cleveland, Cincinnati, Chicago and St. Louis Railway (Big Four) and eventually the New York Central Railroad and Conrail. By 1906, the parallel Big Four and Chicago and Alton Railroad lines between Bridge Junction (East St. Louis) and Wann (near East Alton), the former just east of the latter, were being operated as a double-track line by both companies through reciprocal trackage rights.

In July 1993, the Interstate Commerce Commission approved purchase by Gateway Eastern of this line from Conrail, as well as a  segment of the ex-Pennsylvania Railroad Main Line (Pittsburgh to St. Louis) from the Mississippi River just north of the Eads Bridge to Conrail's Rose Lake Yard at Willows. A short segment of trackage rights over the Terminal Railroad Association of St. Louis's (TRRA's) Eads Subdivision, also acquired from Conrail, connected the two lines. Gateway Eastern also had access to CSX Transportation's Cone Yard, west of Willows. Operations began January 28, 1994.

In order to connect its sections without trackage rights, Gateway Western bought a strip of land from CSX Transportation on which it planned to build the "Q Connection", crossing the TRRA north of "Q Tower". After a seven-year legal battle with the TRRA, during which Gateway Western placed the line in service in May 1995 through a temporary injunction, the courts ruled in favor of Gateway Western, then part of KCS, in 1998.

Operations

Gateway Eastern's primary business was switching ex-Conrail customers in the Alton area from Conrail's Rose Lake Yard (now CSX). It had one locomotive, a 1969 EMD GP38, and operated one scheduled train per day, five days per week. Interchange was with its parent Gateway Western, Conrail, and the Southern Pacific Transportation Company subsidiary SPCSL. The reciprocal trackage rights agreement from 1906 with the Alton continues to this day, now between Gateway Eastern and the Union Pacific Railroad (successor to SPCSL, purchaser of the ex-Alton main line).

References

Illinois railroads
Predecessors of the Kansas City Southern Railway
Railway companies established in 1994
Spin-offs of Conrail